Ann Schein Carlyss is an American pianist.

Life and career
Schein spent her early years in Evanston, Illinois, but she moved to Washington D.C. when she was 4. At age 5, she began her piano training with Glenn and Bessie Gunn. She went on to study at the Peabody Conservatory under the direction of Mieczyslaw Munz. She attended the Holton-Arms School.  In 1961, she began lessons with Arthur Rubinstein. The next year, she performed a solo debut at Carnegie Hall, followed by a performance at the White House in 1963 for President and Mrs. John F. Kennedy. In 1965, she toured the Middle East and South Asia for the US State Department, and performed at the Cairo Opera House.

In 1980, Ann Schein presented an entire season of the major Chopin repertoire in Lincoln Center's Alice Tully Hall, going through the entire Chopin cycle.  From 1980 until 2000, when she retired, Ann was a member of the piano faculty at the Peabody Conservatory in Baltimore. She has been an Artist-Faculty member of the Aspen Music Festival and School since 1984 and is a sought-after adjudicator in major international music competitions. During the summer of 2005, she opened the series of the complete Beethoven Sonatas performed by members of the piano faculty.  The Washington International Piano Competition has established an award in Schein's and her mother's name.

Recordings
Her first recordings were made for Kapp Records, with a 1957 recording of Chopin's second piano concerto. This was followed two years later by an album entitled "Miss Ann Schein: A truly brilliant pianist". Other albums included the Chopin Scherzi and an album of etudes as well as Chopin's 2nd and Rachmaninoff's 3rd piano concertos with Sir Eugene Goossens as conductor.

Her recording of solo piano works of Schumann was released in 2001 on the Ivory Classics label.
A new recording of the Chopin Preludes and the B minor Sonata was released by MSR Classics in 2005.
[ Mozart: Trio in Ef; Bruch: Pieces Op83/1-8], 1990 (Koch International Classics)
[ Rorem: Day Music; Night Music], 1991 (Phoenix USA)
[ Stravinsky: L'oiseau de feu No2; Duo Concertante], 1991 (Koch International Classics)
[ Kirchner, Copland, Ives: Music for Violin and Piano] (Phoenix USA)
[ Jessye Norman Sings Alban Berg], 1995 (Sony)
[ Ann Schein plays Schumann: Davidsbündlertänze; Arabeske; Humoreske], 2000 (Ivory Classics)

Reviews
"In the 1960s the American pianist Ann Schein had a big success with Rachmaninov's Third Concerto. Davidsbündlertänze and Humoresque have been part of Schein's repertoire since the early days of her career - indeed she played the former at her Carnegie Hall debut in 1962. Schumann's popular Arabesque is performed fluently, the coda beautifully contemplative. Recorded at Spencerville Church in Maryland, the sound is resonant and full." International Piano Quarterly - Summer 2001

"Schein has made the Romantic literature the centerpiece of her repertoire, hardly surprising considering her teachers, Mieczyslaw Munz at the Curtis Institute, Arthur Rubinstein, and Dame Myra Hess. She has lived with these major Schumann works long and intimately, and it shows in her performances as well as in her descriptive notes. With fluent keyboard technique at her disposal, Schein invests these works with poetic imagination and romantic flair. Her readings tend to be straightforward and without exaggeration, but sensitive and subtly nuanced. The recorded sound is close and vivid, adding to the enjoyment of this disc." Fanfare Magazine - July/August 2001

References

Sources
 Artist's biography published with Ann Schein's CD "Schumann: Davidsbündlertänze, Arabeske, Humoreske", 2000, Ivory Classics, Columbus Ohio. 64405-71006
 Details of Kapp recordings obtained by searching  Dec 14 2009

External links
Faculty biography at Kent State University
Mini-biography from the University of Georgia's Celebration of Liszt and Matthay
Biography at Aspen Music Festival and School

1939 births
Aspen Music Festival and School faculty
Living people
Jewish classical pianists
20th-century American pianists
20th-century American women pianists
21st-century classical pianists
Women music educators
21st-century American women pianists
21st-century American pianists